German submarine U-661 was a Type VIIC U-boat built for Nazi Germany's Kriegsmarine for service during World War II.
She was laid down on 12 March 1941 by Howaldtswerke, Hamburg as yard number 810, launched on 11 December 1941 and commissioned on 12 February 1942 under Oberleutnant zur See Erich von Lilienfeld.

Design
German Type VIIC submarines were preceded by the shorter Type VIIB submarines. U-661 had a displacement of  when at the surface and  while submerged. She had two shafts and two  propellers.

U-661 was fitted with five  torpedo tubes (four fitted at the bow and one at the stern), fourteen torpedoes, one  SK C/35 naval gun, 220 rounds, and a  C/30 anti-aircraft gun. The boat had a complement of between forty-four and sixty.

Service history
The boat's career began with training at 5th U-boat Flotilla on 12 February 1942, followed by active service on 1 October 1942 as part of the 3rd Flotilla for the remainder of her very short career.

Wolfpacks
U-661 took part in three wolfpacks, namely:
 Pfeil (12 – 22 September 1942)
 Blitz (22 – 26 September 1942)
 Wotan (12 – 15 October 1942)

Fate
U-661 was sunk on 15 October 1942 in the North Atlantic in position , she was rammed and thereafter sunk by gun fire and a heavy depth charge from Royal Navy destroyer . All hands were lost.

Summary of raiding history

See also
 Convoy SC 104

References

Bibliography

External links

German Type VIIC submarines
1941 ships
U-boats commissioned in 1942
Ships lost with all hands
U-boats sunk in 1942
U-boats sunk by depth charges
U-boats sunk by British warships
World War II shipwrecks in the Atlantic Ocean
World War II submarines of Germany
Ships built in Hamburg
Maritime incidents in October 1942